The Engineer Mohammed Bashir Karaye Prize for Hausa Writing is a Nigerian literature prize given to authors who publish in the Hausa language. Founded in 2007 by the widow of the prize's namesake, the Karaye Prize is funded by the Bashir Karaye Foundation and administered by the Association of Nigerian Authors, Abuja Chapter.

References

External links
https://web.archive.org/web/20160305010111/http://234next.com/csp/cms/sites/Next/ArtsandCulture/Books/5531608-147/story.csp

Hausa language
Nigerian literary awards
Awards established in 2007
Hausa-language literature awards